Horton Plaza Park is an outdoor venue located in the heart of downtown San Diego, which had its grand opening on May 4, 2016. Located on the corner of 4th Avenue and Broadway, the plaza preserves the history and integrity of the original Horton Plaza, while adding key features to enhance the area. In addition to restoring the Broadway Fountain, the park includes an amphitheater for live music acts, retail Pavilions and a new, interactive fountain. The plaza was designated a historical landmark by the City of San Diego on March 19, 1971.
The city-owned park was designed by landscape architect Walker Macy and built by Civic San Diego.

Geography 
The plaza is bordered to the north by Broadway Ave and the U.S. Grant Hotel, former site of the Horton House Hotel. Flanking the east and west are 4th and 3rd Avenues, respectively. Immediately to the south is the Westfield Horton Plaza shopping mall.

History

1890 – 1960 

The area of the park was sold to the city of San Diego in 1895 by its namesake, Alonzo Horton. Originally, the plaza was intended for use by his guests staying at the Horton House Hotel. In 1909, the plaza was chosen as the site of a "weather kiosk" provided by the U.S. Weather Bureau. Park commissioners laid out the plaza in harmony with the lines of the kiosk, according to one source, reserving the center for a fountain. Louis J. Wilde, banker and part-owner of the U. S. Grant Hotel, donated funds to help build a fountain located in the center of the Park. Irving J. Gill designed the Broadway Fountain, which was completed in 1910.

In 1926, a plaque commemorating the western terminus of the Jefferson Davis Highway was installed in Horton Plaza. It has since been moved to the western sidewalk of the plaza following the 2016 renovation. Following the Charlottesville terror attack in Virginia, the San Diego City Council removed the plaque on August 16, 2017.

1960 – 1970s 
Throughout the years, the Horton Plaza Park was the backdrop for many notable events. On November 2, 1960, then-Senator John F. Kennedy spoke at Horton Plaza to make a last-minute appeal for votes just six days before the 1960 Presidential Election. On March 19, 1971, the City of San Diego designated the plaza as a historical landmark.

2010 - present 

In 2011, the San Diego City Council unanimously voted to approve a unique public-private partnership between Westfield and the City of San Diego. This plan involved Westfield demolishing the former Robinsons-May and Planet Hollywood building at Westfield Horton Plaza Shopping Center and transferring the land to the city. The operators of the adjacent Westfield Horton Plaza shopping center partnered with the city in the renovation.

The overall project aims to restore the historic Horton Plaza Park and fountain, re-establishing it as the regional treasure that it was in the early-to-mid 1900s. The aim was for the plaza to host scheduled events such as concerts, movie screenings, and celebrations. The park opened in May 2016.

Broadway Fountain
The fountain in the middle of the plaza was designed by Irving Gill, which he modeled after the Choragic Monument of Lysicrates. Louis J. Wilde, banker and part-owner of the U. S. Grant Hotel, donated $10,000 to help build the fountain, which was completed in 1910. The engraving on the frieze reads "Broadway Fountain for the People."

Cold weather in January 1913 caused the water in the fountain to freeze, an event rare in the region. San Diegans visited the fountain and stood on the thick ice.

The restored Gill fountain is the centerpiece of the plaza, which also has an amphitheater, an interactive pop-jet fountain, and light sculptures.

Amenities 
Included in the plaza are granite finishes, an interactive pop-jet fountain and 8 Luminaries ( color-changing light sculptures).
There are three food and beverage Pavilions located at Horton Plaza Park including Starbucks and Sloan's Ice Cream. Each Pavilion has adjacent patio seating covered by a trellised overhang.

The onsite ArtsTix Ticket Booth offers tickets to local theaters and other attractions and is operated by the San Diego Performing Arts League. The Park offers recreational, cultural, educational and promotional events for the community, including Park Unplugged, a free ongoing entertainment series, and Plaza Play, an ongoing game series. Horton Plaza Park is available to rent for public or private functions.

See also

 List of parks in San Diego
 List of San Diego Historic Landmarks
 List of Confederate monuments and memorials

References

External links 

 Official Website
 Horton Park Plaza Opening May 4

Urban public parks
Parks in San Diego
History of San Diego
Historic districts in San Diego
Tourist attractions in San Diego
Gaslamp Quarter, San Diego